Scott Shepherd is an American film, theater, and television actor, best known for his appearances in the films Side Effects (2013), Bridge of Spies (2015), Jason Bourne (2016) and El Camino: A Breaking Bad Movie (2019), as well as the series The Young Pope and The Last of Us.

Career 
Shepherd began his acting career in theater. He has appeared in several productions of The Wooster Group and is also known for his work as narrator in the play Gatz by Elevator Repair Service.

In 2014, Shepherd appeared in the comedy film And So It Goes as Luke, along with Michael Douglas, Diane Keaton, and Sterling Jerins. Rob Reiner directed the film, which was released on July 25, 2014. In 2015, Shepherd played a supporting role of a CIA operative named Hoffman in the Cold War-era spy film Bridge of Spies opposite Tom Hanks and Mark Rylance. The film was directed by Steven Spielberg, which released on October 16, 2015 by Walt Disney Studios Motion Pictures.

Shepherd also played the role of Cardinal Dussolier in the HBO series The Young Pope along with Jude Law. He was seen in the thriller film Norman: The Moderate Rise and Tragic Fall of a New York Fixer along with Richard Gere. Shepherd had a supporting role as Director of National Intelligence, opposite Matt Damon, in the thriller film Jason Bourne, which was released on July 29, 2016.

Filmography

Film

Television

References

External links 
 

Living people
American male film actors
American male television actors
Place of birth missing (living people)
Year of birth missing (living people)
American male stage actors
21st-century American male actors